Marie Smith may refer to:

Marie Smith Jones (1918–2008), last surviving speaker of the Eyak language of Southcentral Alaska
Marie Selika Williams, née Marie Smith, American coloratura soprano
Marie Smith (bowls), lawn bowler from Guernsey
Marie Smith (activist), activist in Portland, Oregon

See also

Maria Smith (disambiguation)
Mary Smith (disambiguation)